Rembrandt Films is a Czech production company founded by American film producer William L. Snyder in 1949. It began as an importer of films from Europe and expanded into animated film production.

Gene Deitch directed for the company both his own films and cartoons outsourced from American studios such as MGM (Tom and Jerry), and King Features Syndicate (Popeye, Krazy Kat, Snuffy Smith and Beetle Bailey).

Rembrandt Films is now run by the son of William Snyder, Adam Snyder, and his wife Patricia Giniger Snyder. Rembrandt Films is an umbrella company for Rembrandt Communications, Rembrandt Animation and Rembrandt Video Productions. It conducts animation, video production, and business writing.

Notable Works

Animation 
 Little Roquefort
 Munro
 Tom and Jerry
 Popeye
 Nudnik
 Krazy Kat
 Snuffy Smith
 Beetle Bailey
 Alice of Wonderland in Paris

Documentaries 
 Silent Pioneers (Emmy Nominee for Best Program)
 Girona, The Mother of Israel: The Jews of Catalonia
 Caring for Cambodia
 The Children of Oswiecim Remember
 The Technion: Turning Tomorrow's Dreams into Today's Realities
 CADCA: The Dangers of Underage Drinking
 CADCA's Dose of Prevention Award
 Finding Security in an Insecure World
 Turning Passion into Promise to End Duchenne
 Hale House: It's All About the Children
 Hale House: The Mother Hale Way
 A Torah Returns
 The Dreyfus Affair: A Current Affair
 The Many Faces of the Sephardim
 Come Back to the Lower East Side
 In Touch for Life
 The Four Energy Gates (Dr. Nan Lu)

References 

1949 establishments in Czechoslovakia
Companies of Czechoslovakia
Czech animation studios
Film production companies of the Czech Republic
Mass media companies established in 1949